Stračov is a municipality and village in Hradec Králové District in the Hradec Králové Region of the Czech Republic. It has about 300 inhabitants.

Administrative parts
The village of Klenice is an administrative part of Stračov.

Notable people
Eduard Čech (1893–1960), mathematician

References

External links

 

Villages in Hradec Králové District